HMAS Horsham (J235/M235), named for the city of Horsham, Victoria, was one of 60 Bathurst-class corvettes constructed during World War II, and one of 36 initially manned and commissioned solely by the Royal Australian Navy (RAN).

Design and construction

In 1938, the Australian Commonwealth Naval Board (ACNB) identified the need for a general purpose 'local defence vessel' capable of both anti-submarine and mine-warfare duties, while easy to construct and operate. Construction of the prototype  did not go ahead, but the plans were retained. The need for locally built 'all-rounder' vessels at the start of World War II saw the "Australian Minesweepers" (designated as such to hide their anti-submarine capability, but popularly referred to as "corvettes") approved in September 1939, with 60 constructed during the course of the war: 36 (including Horsham) ordered by the RAN, 20 ordered by the British Admiralty but manned and commissioned as RAN vessels, and 4 for the Royal Indian Navy.

Horsham was laid down by HMA Naval Dockyard at Melbourne, Victoria on 26 June 1941. She was launched on 16 May 1942, and was commissioned into the RAN on 18 November 1942.

Operational history
Horsham entered active service in January 1943. She was initially assigned to Fremantle as an anti-submarine patrol ship, where she remained until August 1944. The corvette was then deployed to Darwin as a survey ship, and remained there until the end of World War II. In September 1945, Horsham was present at the Japanese surrender of Timor. She continued in the survey role until November 1945, when she returned to Fremantle.

Decommissioning and fate
Horsham paid off into reserve in Fremantle on 17 December 1945. She was sold for scrapping to the Hong Kong Delta Shipping Company on 8 August 1956.

Citations

References
Books

Journal and news articles

Bathurst-class corvettes of the Royal Australian Navy
Ships built in Victoria (Australia)
1942 ships
World War II corvettes of Australia
Survey ships of the Royal Australian Navy